Haji Essa Khan Bhurgri (حاجي عيسا خان ڀرڳڙي) is a village of Talhar taluka, located 7 km east of Rajo Khanani.

Populated places in Badin District